Ananta Tamang (born 14 January 1998) is a Nepalese professional footballer who plays as a defender for Nepal Super League club FC Chitwan and the Nepal national team. He was vice-captain of Nepal under-19 football team which went on to win the 2015 SAFF U-19 Championship. Tamang made his senior national team debut on 31 August 2015 in a friendly against India.

Club career

Earlier career
In January 2017, Tamang earned a spot to train and be a part of Spanish club Marbella United's pre-season duties in 2015–16 season. He later joined the club in 2018 but shortly after, he got injured.

He later moved back to Nepal and signed with Martyr's Memorial A-Division League side Three Star Club.

East Bengal
On 10 February 2022, Tamang was roped in by Indian Super League club SC East Bengal. He joined the club as their sole AFC Quota replacing Australian defender Tomislav Mrcela. He made his debut for club on March 5, against Bengaluru FC in a 1–0 defeat, which was their final game of the season.

Chitwan
On 6 March 2022, Tamang joined Nepal Super League outfit FC Chitwan.

International career

U-16
Tamang represented Nepal at the 2014 AFC U-16 Championship, captaining his country in the first game against Uzbekistan in the absence of regular captain Bimal Gharti Magar. Tamang also scored a headed goal in a 1-4 defeat to North Korea, a game which eliminated Nepal from the tournament.

U-19
Tamang played every minute of every game at the 2015 SAFF U-19 Championship as the host Nepal won the tournament. Tamang also played all three games at the 2016 AFC U-19 Championship qualification  but this time they were unsuccessful to qualify.

U-23
Tamang represented Nepal during the 2016 AFC U-23 Championship qualification but his country had a disastrous campaign, losing all four games and failing to score a single goal. Tamang himself had a particularly poor game against Iran where the last two goals of the match where the result of Tamang's poor headed clearances.

Style of play
Tamang comes from traditional cloth. With excellent 1v1 skills, he relies heavily on tackles, last man challenges, and interceptions to get rid of the dangers. His ability to consistently be on track with opposition strikers till the last moment is the key attribute.

Career statistics

International goals
Scores and results list Nepal's goal tally first.

Honours

Nepal U-16 
SAFF U-16 Championship runner-up: 2013

Nepal U-19 
SAFF U-19 Championship: 2015

Nepal U-23 
South Asian Games: 2016
South Asian Games: 2019

Nepal national team 
Bangabandhu Cup: 2016
AFC Solidarity Cup: 2016

References

External links

1998 births
Living people
Nepalese footballers
Nepal international footballers
People from Jhapa District
Association football defenders
Footballers at the 2018 Asian Games
Asian Games competitors for Nepal
South Asian Games gold medalists for Nepal
South Asian Games medalists in football
Expatriate footballers in India
Churchill Brothers FC Goa players
I-League players
Nepalese expatriate sportspeople in India
East Bengal Club players
Indian Super League players
Tamang people